Aivaras Stepukonis (born 1972) is a Lithuanian musician and philosopher.

Biography 
From 1983 to 1986 he studied at the Kaunas music school Nr. 1 and from 1987 to 1991 at Kauno konservatorija (the clarinet class). 
From 1992 to 1994 Stepukonis earned baccalaureate in theology and philosophy from the Franciscan University of Steubenville (Ohio, USA) in 1995 and master's degree from the International Academy of Philosophy in Schaan (Liechtenstein) in 1997. 
From 2001 to 2005 he received his doctorate in philosophy at the Lithuanian Culture, Philosophy, and Art Research Institute in Vilnius. In 2005, he defended his PhD thesis at the Institute. In the same year he published monograph on Max Scheler and sociology of knowledge (Pavergto mąstymo problema: Maxas Scheleris ir žinojimo sociologijos ištakos). In 2007, he received a research fellowship from UNESCO and Keizō Obuchi to study of the University of Hawaii. Since 2005 he is a Senior Fellow at the Institute for Science Lithuanian Cultural Studies. Since 2007 he is also a director of UAB "Kranto studijos".

He was vocals in a band called Pėdsakai (Footprints) from 1998 until 2001, when he decided to start a solo career. He was nominated as the artists of the year for the 2001 Bravo awards. In the national selections for the Eurovision Song Contest 2002,  he placed second. Nevertheless, he was allowed to represent Lithuania with the song Happy You at the international final in Tallinn because the winners B'Avarija were disqualified. Aivaras was not very successful reaching only 23rd place. Since then, Stepukonis has released three solo albums: eponymous Aivaras, Myliu arba tyliu, and Sage & Fool. After the second album he retired from the stage, working as composer and sound director with other artists.

Discography
Aivaras (2002)
Myliu arba tyliu (2005)
Sage & Fool (2010)

References

External links
 Sample songs at Music.lt
  

1972 births
21st-century Lithuanian male singers
Franciscan University of Steubenville alumni
Eurovision Song Contest entrants for Lithuania
Eurovision Song Contest entrants of 2002
Lithuanian pop singers
Living people
English-language singers from Lithuania
Musicians from Vilnius
Musicians from Kaunas
21st-century Lithuanian philosophers